The 1995 Singapore Open (also known as the Konica Cup) was a five-star badminton tournament that took place at the Singapore Indoor Stadium in Singapore, from July 17 to July 23, 1995. The total prize money on offer was US$165,000.

Venue
Singapore Indoor Stadium

Final results

References

Singapore Open (badminton)
Singapore
1995 in Singaporean sport